Berkut may refer to:

 Asian golden eagle or berkut, a bird of prey
 Berkut (special police force), the former special units of the Ukrainian police and current units of the Russian Crimean police
 The Berkut, a 1987 novel by Joseph Heywood
 S-25 Berkut, a Russian surface-to-air missile system known to NATO as the SA-1 Guild
 Su-47 Berkut, a Russian experimental supersonic jet fighter developed by Sukhoi
 Berkut, a radar reported to be used on the Il-38 and Tu-142 aircraft for antisubmarine warfare
 Berkut 360, a US home-built aircraft
 Berkut Air, an airline based in Almaty, Kazakhstan
 Berkut rifle, a semi-automatic hunting rifle designed and manufactured in Russia
 Berkut spacesuit, a Soviet space suit developed in 1964–1965
 Kresta I-class cruiser or Berkut, a surface warfare guided missile cruiser
 Kresta II-class cruiser or Berkut, an anti-submarine guided missile cruiser
 Berkut Group, a fictional organization in Bionic Woman
 Berkut, Russian oil platform in the Okhotsk Sea
 , a Russian helicopter
 HC Berkut, a Ukrainian professional ice hockey team
 HC Berkut-Kyiv, a Ukrainian ice hockey team from 1997 to 2002
 Berkut Stadium, a football stadium
 Berkut, an antagonist from Fire Emblem Echoes: Shadows of Valentia

People with the surname
 Arthur Berkut (born 1962), Russian singer
 Nataliya Berkut (born 1975), Ukrainian long-distance runner

See also
 Golden Eagle (disambiguation)